Harry Dodge (born 1966) is an American sculptor, performer, video artist, professor, and writer.

His solo exhibitions have included works in New York, Los Angeles and Connecticut, while his group exhibitions have taken place at The New Museum, the Whitney Biennial, the Getty Museum and the Hammer Museum, among others. He was the recipient of a Guggenheim Fellowship in 2017 and is the author of the book My Meteorite: Or, Without the Random There Can Be No New Thing (2020). He lives and works in Los Angeles, California.

Early life
Dodge was born in 1966 in San Francisco, California. Dodge earned an MFA degree in Fine Art in 2002 from the Milton Avery School of the Arts at Bard College.

Career
In the early 1990s, Dodge was one of the founders of and curators for the San Francisco community-based performance space, Red Dora's Bearded Lady Coffeehouse. During this time Dodge wrote, directed, and performed several evening-length, monologue-based performances, including "Muddy Little River" (1996) and "From Where I'm Sitting (I Can Only Reach Your Ass)" (1997).

In the late 1990s, Dodge co-wrote, directed, edited and starred in (with Silas Howard) a narrative feature film, By Hook or By Crook, which premiered at the Sundance Film Festival (2002), and received five Best Feature awards at various film festivals. Dodge also performed in the 2000 John Waters film Cecil B. Demented.

From 2004 to 2008, while continuing to make solo work, Dodge formed half of a video-making collaboration with artist Stanya Kahn.

Since 2008, Dodge has focused on sculpture, drawing, video, and writing. His interdisciplinary practice is “characterized by its explorations of relation, materiality and ecstatic contamination”. Artforum says his “dense, idea-rich” works are “designed to hold ideas of individuality and multiplicity in tension and to create spaces of dynamic slippage between the whole and its parts.”

Dodge teaches in the School of Art at California Institute of the Arts (CalArts) and in sculpture program of the Milton Avery School of the Arts at Bard College.

Exhibitions

Solo exhibitions
2019 Callicoon Fine Arts, New York, New York
2018 Works of Love, JOAN, Los Angeles, California
2017 Mysterious Fires, Grand Army Collective, New York, New York 
2015 The Cybernetic Fold, Wallspace, New York 
2013 Meaty Beaty Big & Bouncy, Aldrich Contemporary Art Museum, Ridgefield, Connecticut
2013 Frowntown, Wallspace, New York

Group exhibitions
 2019 Avengers--Someone Left the Cake Out in the Rain, Gaga and Reena Spaulings Fine Art, Los Angeles, California 
 2017 The New Museum, New York City, New York 
 2014 Made in L.A., Hammer Museum, Los Angeles, California
 2008 Whitney Biennial, New York City, New York
 2009 Code Share: 5 continents, 10 biennales, 20 artists, CAC Vilnius, Lithuania
 Videonale 12, Kunstalle Bonn, Bonn, Germany 
 2009 Reflections on the Electric Mirror: New Feminist Video, Brooklyn Museum of Art
 2008 California Video Getty Museum, Los Angeles, California; 
 2007 Between Two Deaths, ZKM/Center for Art and Media, Karlsruhe, Germany
 2007 Eden’s Edge Hammer Museum, Los Angeles, California<ref>Eden's Edge: Fifteen LA Artists | Hammer Museum  den's Edge: Fifteen LA Artists][https://hammer.ucla.edu/exhibitions/2007/edens-edge-fifteen-la-artists</ref> 
 Triples: Harry Dodge, Evan Holloway, Peter Shelton, The Approach, London, England

Collections
Dodge's collaborative work with Stanya Kahn, Can't Swallow It, Can't Spit It Out, is part of the permanent collection of the Museum of Modern Art in New York. Dodge's solo work is also included in the collections of the Museum of Contemporary Art, Los Angeles, and the Hammer Museum.

 Awards 
In 2017 Dodge was awarded a Guggenheim Fellowship. In 2012, he received an Art Matters grant.

His co-directed film By Hook or By Crook received several awards, including Best Feature, Audience Award at Outfest Los Angeles Lesbian & Gay Film Festival; Best Screenplay, Grand Jury Prize at Outfest Los Angeles Lesbian & Gay Film Festival; Best Feature, Jury Prize at Seattle Lesbian & Gay Film Festival; Best New Director, Jury Prize at Seattle Lesbian & Gay Film Festival; Best Feature, Audience Award at Mardi Gras Festival, Australia; Best Feature, Audience Award at South by Southwest Film Festival; Best Feature, Jury Award at Philadelphia Lesbian & Gay Film Festival.

 Personal life 
Dodge is married to the author Maggie Nelson, with whom he has a child. He has an older child from a previous relationship.

Dodge uses the pronoun “he,” but has long expressed disinterest in gender designations. He identifies as a butch. In a 2017 interview with Lunch Ticket'' he discusses an interest in Adorno’s theory of “non-identity,” or “non-language knowings.”

Bibliography

References

External links
 Official web site
 Interview with Harry Dodge with Sarah Sulistio 
 Review of “Frowntown” in Artforum 
 Review of “Works of Love” in Artforum 
 Review of “User” in Artforum
 Review of “The Cybernetic Fold” in The New York Times

20th-century American sculptors
1966 births
Living people
LGBT film directors
American LGBT artists
Artists from San Francisco
LGBT people from California
Bard College alumni
Non-binary artists
Transgender artists
California Institute of the Arts faculty
21st-century American sculptors
American non-binary writers